Katherine Smiley Ramos Carpio (born 28 October 1991) is a Guatemalan retired footballer who played as a forward. She has been a member of the Guatemala women's national team.

International career
Ramos represented Guatemala at the 2010 CONCACAF Women's U-20 Championship. At senior level, she capped during the 2010 CONCACAF Women's World Cup Qualifying (and its qualification), the 2010 Central American and Caribbean Games, the 2012 CONCACAF Women's Olympic Qualifying Tournament (and its qualification) and the 2013 Central American Games.

References

1991 births
Living people
Guatemalan women's footballers
Guatemala women's international footballers
Women's association football forwards
Central American Games bronze medalists for Guatemala
Central American Games medalists in football